Baldur Þór Bjarnason (born 3 July 1969) is an Icelandic former footballer who played as a forward. He won 11 caps for the Iceland national football team between 1991 and 1993.

References

1969 births
Living people
Baldur Thor Bjarnason
Association football forwards
Baldur Thor Bjarnason
Baldur Thor Bjarnason
Baldur Thor Bjarnason
Stjarnan players